The Chitarwata Formation is a geological formation in western Pakistan, made up of Oligocene and early Miocene terrestrial fluvial facies. The sediments were deposited in coastal depositional environments (estuarine, strandplain and tidal flats) when Pakistan was partly covered by the Tethys Ocean.

Paleomagnetic data indicates an age range of around 28 to 17 million years ago, with its base in the Oligocene, and its upper boundary, where it meets the overlying Vihowa Formation, of the Early Miocene.

Together with the Vihowa Formation, the Chitarwata Formation records the sedimentation of the Himalayan foreland basin during the collision of the Indian and Asian tectonic plates, the transition from marginal marine to fluvial environments, and the rise of the Himalayas.

Fossil content 
The Chitarwata Formation has provided a wealth of terrestrial mammal fossils of the late Paleogene and early Neogene, or Tabenbulakian; the last of the Asian land mammal ages (ALMA).

Among many others, the following fossils are reported from the formation:

Mammals 

 Anthracotherium adiposum, A. bugtiense, A. silistrense
 Asiadelphis akbarbugtii
 Atavocricetodon paaliense
 Baluchimys barryi, B. chaudryi, B. ganeshapher
 Brachypotherium fatehjangense
 Bugtilemur mathesoni
 Bugtimeryx pilgrimi
 Bugtimys zafarullahi
 Bugtipithecus inexpectans
 Bugtitherium grandincisivum
 Buzdartherium gulkirao
 Downsimys margolesi, D. margolisi
 Fallomus ginsburgi, F. quraishyi, F. razae
 Guangxilemur singsilai
 Hodsahibia azrae, H. beamshaiensis, H. gracilis
 Lindsaya derabugtiensis
 Lophibaluchia pilbeami
 Lophiomeryx kargilensis
 Microbunodon silistrense
 Nalameryx savagei, N. sulaimani
 Paalitherium gurki
 Parabrachyodus hyopotamoides
 Paraceratherium bugtiense
 Paraentelodon sp.
 Phileosimias brahuiorum, P. kamali
 Primus cheemai
 Prokanisamys arifi
 Progiraffa exigua
 Pseudocricetodon nawabi
 Sivameryx palaeindicus
 Spanocricetodon sulaiman
 Zindapiria quadricollis
 Deinotherium sp.

Reptiles
 Astorgosuchus bugtiensis

Fish
 Carcharhinus balochenisis, C. perseus
 Cretolamna twiggensis
 Hemiprisris heteropleurus
 Nebrius obliquum

References

Further reading 
 S. Adnet, P. -O. Antoine, S. R. Hassan Baqri, J. Crochet, L. Marivaux, J. Welcomme, and G. Métais. 2007. New tropical carcharhinids (chondrichthyes, Carcharhiniformes) from the late Eocene–early Oligocene of Balochistan, Pakistan: Paleoenvironmental and paleogeographic implications. Journal of Asian Earth Sciences 30(2):303-323
 G. Métais, P.-O. Antoine, S. R. H. Baqri, M. Benammi, J.-Y. Crochet, D. Franceschi, L. Marivaux and J.-L. Welcomme. 2006. New remains of the enigmatic cetartiodactyl Bugtitherium grandincisivum Pilgrim, 1908, from the upper Oligocene of the Bugti Hills (Balochistan, Pakistan). Naturwissenschaften 93(7):348-355
 E. H. Lindsay, L. J. Flynn, I. U. Cheema, J. C. Barry, K. Downing, A. R. Rajpar, and S. M. Raza. 2005. Will Downs and the Zinda Pir Dome. Palaeontologia Electronica 8(1):19A:1-18
 L. Marivaux, P.-O. Antoine, S. R. H. Baqri, M. Benammi, and Y. Chaimanee. 2005. Anthropoid primates from the Oligocene of Pakistan (Bugti Hills): Data on early anthropoid evolution and biogeography. Proceedings of the National Academy of Sciences 102(24):8436-8441 
 P.-O. Antoine, J.-L. Welcomme, L. Marivaux, I. Baloch, M. Benammi and P. Tassy. 2003. First record of Paleogene Elephantoidea (Mammalia, Proboscidea) from the Bugti Hills of Pakistan. Journal of Vertebrate Paleontology 23(4):977-980
 J.-L. Welcomme and L. Ginsburg. 1997. Mise en évidence de l'Oligocène sur le territoire des Bugti (Balouchistan, Pakistan). Comptes Rendus de l'Académie des Sciences, Série IIA 325(12):999-1004
 L.J. Flynn, L.L. Jacobs, and I.U. Cheema. 1986. Baluchimyinae, A New Ctenodactyloid Rodent Subfamily from the Miocene of Baluchistan. American Museum Novitates 2841:1-58

External links 
 Palaeontologia Electronica

Geologic formations of Pakistan
Neogene System of Asia
Paleogene System of Asia
Rupelian Stage
Chattian Stage
Aquitanian (stage)
Burdigalian
Sandstone formations
Shale formations
Fluvial deposits
Fossiliferous stratigraphic units of Asia
Paleontology in Pakistan
Formations